The yeoman rate is one of the oldest rates in the U.S. Navy, dating back to 1794. Historically, the Navy yeomen were responsible for keeping the storerooms for the ship's gunners, carpenters and boatswains. With the transition from sail to steam, yeomen were assigned to the ship's engineers. In the modern Navy, a yeoman is an enlisted service member who performs administrative and clerical work.

History

Formation of the U.S. Navy 
The U.S. Constitution (Article I, Section 8, Clause 14) granted the new U.S. Congress the power to build and maintain a navy. It was not until 1794, when the deteriorating U.S. relations with Great Britain and France, as well as the continuing attacks by Barbary pirates, forced Congress to appropriate funds to construct 6 frigates. Congress stipulated that each ship was to have one yeoman of the gun room and one captain's clerk. The captain's clerk was the ancestor of the modern yeoman. Both of these positions were considered as petty officers. Carpenter's yeoman and gunner's yeoman followed in 1798, then boatswain's yeoman in 1799. In the early U.S. Navy, the petty officers, who were appointed by the ship's captain, served at his pleasure. They did not retain their rank when they moved to another ship. No uniform regulations were specified for the petty officers and enlisted men until 1817.

War of 1812

Civil War Era

Yeoman recipients of the Navy Medal of Honor 

Thomas Atkinson, Yeoman
William Wright, Yeoman

Spanish–American War Era

Gallery

World War I Era 
With the US Declaration of War against Imperial Germany in April 1917, the Navy needed trained men quickly. Recruits who had the aptitude to be yeomen attended Yeoman School. As the war effort escalated, the US Navy found itself lacking personnel to perform the shore-based duties necessary to support more than 128,000 enlisted personnel. On 17 March 1917, Secretary of the Navy Josephus Daniels received authorization to enlist women to perform yeoman's duties. They were designated "yeoman (F)".

Yeoman School 
The Yeoman School, one of the Navy's Trade Schools, had two locations: Newport in Rhode Island, and San Francisco in California. To enter Yeoman School, the recruit was required to have some prior clerical experience, be able to write legibly, and type a 200-word letter with a passing grade of 70% or better. Knowledge of stenography was desirable, but not required. "Steno" classes would be available after hours.

Preliminary classes, lasting between 4–6 weeks, would cover arithmetic, spelling, composition, and general naval knowledge. The final examination would determine eligibility for the next level of classes.
Supply-officer department classes covered preparation of requisitions, surveys, public bills, official returns, and supply-related duties. General bookkeeping, inventories, mess statements, and balance sheets were also taught. Executive-officer department classes covered record-keeping for enlisted men. Correct preparation of forms for arrival/departure of men; ratings and disratings; appointments; and discharges, desertions, and death were covered. Pay-officer department classes required a thorough knowledge of arithmetic. Making up payrolls, computing pay for officers and enlisted men (including allowances, bounties, and extra pay), calculating credit and interest on payroll savings accounts, and preparing payroll checks were some of the duties covered in these classes.
Commanding-officer department classes covered the production of various forms of official correspondence, such as official letters, and endorsements. The yeoman had to be familiar with the channels through which the documents would pass, as well as the approved filing systems for storing the paperwork. Generating the proceedings for courts-martial and other courts of inquiry or inquests was also covered. The use and proper care of a typewriter was extremely important in the preparation of these documents. Each of the above classes was 5 weeks long.

Upon entering Yeoman School, the recruit's ranking was landsman-for-yeoman, with a monthly salary of $17.60. Good grades and good conduct could be rewarded with a promotion to landsman-for-yeoman, second class, and a monthly salary of $20.90. Upon graduation, the ranking would be either yeoman, third class (Y3C), at $33.00 per month or yeoman, second class (Y2C), at $38.00 per month. The new yeomen would be granted 10 days leave, with additional time allowed for travel, before transferring to his next station.

Yeoman (F) 

The Civil Service Commission notified Navy Secretary Josephus Daniels in early 1917 that it could not supply the clerical support needed by the Navy. Exactly who originated the idea of enlisting women with the necessary skills is uncertain. Daniels consulted his legal staff as to whether the language of The Naval Act of 1916 prohibited women. Advised that it did not, Daniels responded, "Then enroll women in the Naval Reserve as yeomen,’ I said, ‘and we will have the best clerical assistance the country can provide.’" By war's end, there were more than 11,000 women serving as yeoman (F) of the US Naval Reserve. The women also contributed to the war effort in non-clerical positions, replacing their male counterparts who were called for sea duty. They became switchboard operators, recruiters, code decipher clerks, painters, look-outs at naval bases, translators, and messengers. They also dispersed pay, designed ship camouflage, and manufactured munitions. As Secretary Daniels had observed, “They did everything except go to sea.” Yeoman (F) recruitment stopped on 11 November 1918. The young women had enlisted for 4 years, so they remained on active duty until 1920. Afterwards, many of their supervisors urged Daniels to retain the now-discharged yeomen as civilians doing the same jobs.

Sinking of USS President Lincoln 

Convoy escort duty of the ships transporting men and materiel to Europe became the primary function of the US Navy during WW 1. This was originally the responsibility of the US Army Transport Service, but it was not equipped to provide the vessels needed to transport the American Expeditionary Force (AEF) to Europe, so the US Navy assumed the role of transporting the AEF, with its Cruiser and Transport Force (CTS), and established a trans-Atlantic convoy system in cooperation with Great Britain. USS President Lincoln was part of the CTS.

President Lincoln left Brest, France on 29 May 1918 with 715 persons aboard, including crew, wounded US Army soldiers and other passengers aboard. She sailed in convoy with 3 other transport ships. The convoy escorts left the westbound ships on the evening of 30 May to meet up with an east-bound convoy. The westbound convoy was considered to be safe from German submarines during the night. However, the U-90 had spotted the convoy earlier that afternoon and raced ahead. U-90 attacked the convoy about 9 am on 31 May. Struck by three torpedoes, she sank about 30 minutes later. Three officers and twenty-three enlisted men were killed. None of the Army wounded or other passengers were lost. They were rescued later that day by three destroyers dispatched by the escort commander.

One of the sailors who perished was Yeoman 2nd Class Frederick W. Wilson. American Legion Post 62 of Denison, Texas, was named in Wilson's honor. His father, Frederick W. Wilson, Sr, was a Denison resident.

Agnes Meyer Driscoll 

Agnes Meyer Driscoll graduated from Ohio State University in 1911 with a bachelor's degree in mathematics and physics. She was also proficient in four foreign languages: French, Latin, German, and Japanese. Driscoll enlisted with the US Navy as a chief yeoman (F) in 1918, and worked in the Code and Signal Section of the Director of Naval Communications. throughout WWI. After the war ended, she continued working for the US Navy as a civilian crypto-analyst. She was instrumental in breaking the Red Book Japanese naval cipher in the mid-1920s, and the Blue Book Japanese naval cipher in 1930.

About the same time (early 1930s), William D. Puleston, Director of the Office of Naval Intelligence (ONI) suspected the naval attaché office at the Japanese Embassy in Washington D.C. of extending their espionage activities throughout the US. Suspicions of Embassy military officials and possible Japanese naval officers posing as English language students at US universities resulted in increased surveillance, and led to the expulsion of Japanese assistant naval attaché, Yoshiro Kanamoto, for photographing US Navy fuel oil depots. Further decrypted Japanese messages confirmed Director Puleston's suspicions. Driscoll was reviewing a decrypted message which contained the word 'TO-MI-MU-RA'. Unable to recognize the word, she showed the message to a Japanese language specialist. He initially suggested that the word could be a Japanese name, but Driscoll wasn't so sure. His next suggestion was the alternate meaning of 'MU-RA': "son", thus making the entire word mean "Tomison", or "Thompson" in English. The ONI had a lead to an American possibly spying for the Japanese.

Over on the West Coast of the mainland US, Harry J. Thompson was a former US Navy yeoman,and now jobless. In 1934, Thompson had been recruited by Lt Cmdr Toshio Miyazaki of the Imperial Japanese Navy. Miyazaki was posing as Mr. Tanni, an English language exchange student at Stanford University. Thompson was given the uniform of a chief yeoman,and was able to access classified information on gunnery and gunnery tactics. While drunk, Thompson confided to his roommate, Willard James Turrentine, also unemployed, about the spy ring. Turrentine informed the ONI, passing along some of Thompson's correspondence as proof. The Federal Bureau of Investigation (FBI) placed Thompson under surveillance, and arrested him in March 1936 under the Espionage Act of 1917. Thompson was convicted, and sentenced to 15 years at McNeil Island Federal Penitentiary. On the day Thompson was arrested, Miyazaki fled back to Japan.

Yeomen recipients of the Navy Cross 

The Navy Cross award for valor was established by the US Congress on 4 February 1919 to honor sailors and marines who displayed extraordinary heroism in combat with an armed enemy force. The Act was made retroactive to 6 April 1917. The following yeomen received this award:
Chief Yeoman Harry B. Alderman
, February 16, 1918
Citation: "The Navy Cross is awarded to Chief Yeoman Harry B. Alderman, U.S. Navy (Reserve Forces), for extraordinary heroism and devotion to duty on the occasion of a fire on the U.S.S. Cleveland at sea, on February 16, 1918. Chief Yeoman Alderman, with others, descended into a compartment over the after-magazine, filled with smoke and suffocating fumes, and successfully extinguished the fire after forty-five minutes' work."
Yeoman 2nd Class Roger Johnstone
no information available
Yeoman 1st Class Matthew E. O'Gorman
Gunner/Observer, Northern Bombing Groups, June–November, 1918
Citation: "The Navy Cross is awarded to Yeoman First Class Matthew E. O'Gorman, U.S. Navy (Reserve Forces), for distinguished and heroic services as a gunner and observer of airplanes of the Northern Bombing Groups in France, co-operating with the Allied Armies on the Belgian Front, from June to November, 1918, in bombing raids over enemy territory and in action against enemy aircraft."
Chief Yeoman Ralph W. Shuey
, October 15, 1917
Citation: "The Navy Cross is awarded to Chief Yeoman Ralph Waldo E. Shuey, U.S. Navy, for extraordinary heroism and devotion to duty on the occasion of the torpedoing of and explosion on the U.S.S. Cassin on October 15, 1917. Chief Yeoman Shuey, with other members of the crew, was untiring in his work of shoring up bulkheads, restaying masts, and improvising means of towing. He set an example to the younger and less experienced members of the crew."
Chief Yeoman Emerson B. Wentworth
, September 5, 1918
Citation: "The Navy Cross is awarded to Chief Yeoman Emerson B. Wentworth, U.S. Navy, for distinguished service and devotion to duty while serving on the U.S.S. Mount Vernon, when that vessel was torpedoed September 5, 1918. Chief Yeoman Wentworth went to his station at the forward fire control to assume charge, and was on the ladder leading to it, when the ship was struck. By admonitions and physical exertions he forced men back to their stations and duties, materially aiding the proper operation of the fire control and displaying high qualities of leadership."

World War II era 
There were ten yeomen of the executive division of the executive department. The executive department was responsible for all duties on the ship except for those performed by the gunnery and navigation departments. It contained divisions responsible for supply, medical, engineering, security, and the executive functions aboard ship. The yeoman staff included: Chief yeoman (also known as the ship's writer), one yeoman 1st class, three yeoman 2nd class, two yeoman 3rd class, and three seamen who were learning on the job to become yeomen (known as "strikers").

North Carolina was a combat vessel. Therefore, besides the traditional duties of a yeoman "paper-pusher", the yeomen had battle stations to report to when General Quarters was sounded. They were:
Secondary battle plot (battle recorder)
Auxiliary CIC (3JW phone circuit talker)
Turret 2 booth (phone talker)
Damage control station (X1JV phone circuit talker)
Repair 1 (forward) (fire party & traffic control, valveman)
Repair 2 (aft) (fire party)
Repair 3 (chief in charge, fire party, valveman & fire party)
Conning tower (3J2 phone circuit talker, JA phone circuit talker)
Battle II (JA phone circuit talker, JL phone circuit talker)
Central station and forward gyro (JA phone circuit talker)
Note that duties of battle recorder and the various circuit talkers (who relayed orders over the shipboard telephone system) required the attention to detail that was part of the yeoman training. That a yeoman was in charge of the repair parties made use of his organizational skills.

Part of the Judge Advocate's legal staff were yeomen court reporters: Fred R. Wall, chief yeoman,US Naval Reserve (USNR); Thomas E. Lawlor, chief yeoman, USNR; William Behrens, chief yeoman, USNR; and Kenneth R. Heller, yeoman first class, USNR. (In the modern US Navy, this duty is performed by legalmen.)

Indiana University Bloomington 
Indiana University Bloomington (IUB) has been teaching military science since just after the US Civil War. During World War I (WWI), a US Army Reserve Officer Training Corps (ROTC) was established under the Department of Military Science and Tactics, and IU women graduates became yeomen (F). The 7 December 1941 attack on Pearl Harbor galvanized the university administration (some of whom were WWI veterans) and the student body. On Tuesday, 9 December, the student newspaper, Indiana Daily Student, ran an editorial in response to President Franklin Roosevelt's message to Congress on the previous day:
Now we have a job to do. Each citizen has a job: each state has its job, and we on the campus of Indiana University have a job. Our first task must be to keep a clear, level head in the midst of intellectual hysteria that can so easily sweep the country. A university campus is the first place that this objective thinking should be prominent in the settlement of the many problems that now confront us ... We do not want to act in a way that our opportunities to aid mankind in the future will be jeopardized. We must continue to plan for the things that lie beyond this chaotic valley that the world is in now. We are fighting for freedom and democracy now and we want to be prepared to administer it when the war is over.
Between 7–14 January 1942, a committee of administrators, professors, and one student outlined a plan of change to put IUB on a war footing to support the war effort. They adopted a three-semester academic plan to condense a 4-year program into two years and nine months. They also established an organization, the "Junior Division", to help high school graduates make the university transition more easily.

The Naval Training Station at IUB was first considered in 1940, when administrators saw the success of the NROTC (Naval Reserve Officer Training Corps) program at Northwestern University. The US Navy saw the School of Business at IUB as perfect for a Yeoman School. Incorporating NROTC into the university's curriculum meant including Naval V-1 training, a US Naval Reserve Accredited College Program and Naval ROTC. In July 1942, the first class of yeoman recruits arrived for four months of training. Naval instruction occupied 35 classrooms, with 5–6 hours of intense training per day. Course subjects included: general storekeeping, disbursement, provisions, clothing and small stores, aviation, typewriting, spelling, English grammar, and correspondence. By mid-July, the campus began to assume a nautical flavor. The three buildings of the Men's Residence Center, where the yeoman recruits were housed, began to be referred to as "vessels", the student rooms became "cabins", the campus became the "good ship Indiana University" or the "USS Indiana", and Bloomington was the "shore". The Navy students had their own campus newspapers, The Quill and The Yeoman.

During the late fall of 1942, the Navy WAVES began to replace the male sailors. By January 1943, the naval student population was evenly split between men and women. In May, the last of the men were graduated, and the Navy school became exclusively women. The US Coast Guard SPARS arrived in June, followed by the USMCWR (US Marine Corps Women's Reserve). By the fall of 1943, the number of graduates began to exceed the number being assigned to stations. The Naval Training Station was closed on 30 June 1944. The "good ship Indiana University" had trained over 5000 men and women for the US Navy.

WAVES 

The US Naval Reserve (Women's Reserve), more commonly known as the WAVES (Women Accepted for Volunteer Emergency Service), was established by the US Congress on 21 July 1942. Women would be accepted into the Naval Reserve for the duration of the war, plus six months. Both commissioned officers and enlisted personnel were recruited. The enlisted WAVES performed mostly clerical and storekeeping duties onshore, allowing their male counterparts to be reassigned to sea duties. Other enlisted WAVES performed support duties such as aviation mechanists or metalsmiths, parachute riggers, control tower operators, and radio operators.(2001 Goodson) On the second anniversary of the WAVES (not long after the Normandy invasion), President Franklin Roosevelt noted in a speech:
"history will record that the WAVES fulfilled a great purpose. In 500 shore establishments of the fleet, women in uniform took over the work of Navy men. They released enough of them from noncombatant duty to man all our landing craft in two important operations: the Normandy landing on June 6 and the Invasion of Saipan on June 15. The Women’s Reserve will continue to speed the victory day by efficient performance of vital duties ashore."

Iowa State Teacher's College 

Located at Cedar Falls, Iowa, and now part of the University of Northern Iowa, the Iowa State Teacher's College (ISTC) was one of the first basic training facilities for the WAVES recruits. The first class of 1500 WAVE recruits arrived in December 1942 for intensive introductory training lasting 5–6 weeks. Due to the brutal winter weather in the Central Plains of the continental US, physical training for the recruits consisted of indoor activities, such as calisthenics, swimming, and other water sports, such as water polo.

Initially, the Navy combined naval training with job training at "indoctrination schools", which proved to be a mistake. The amount of material covered in classes was massive. The Sextant, the blog of the Naval History and Heritage Command (NHHC), quoted Jacqueline Van Voris (an instrumented flying instructor for Navy pilots between 1944 and 1946) in her unpublished manuscript: "New recruits were warned that one midshipman dropped her pencil during a history lecture and while she was picking it up missed all of the naval battles of the civil war". The Navy also encountered problems with having several indoctrination schools in various locations across the country, so it separated job training as dedicated courses, and consolidated WAVES basic training at Hunter College, The Bronx, New York City. In April 1943, the Yeoman School replaced the indoctrination school at ISTC. The Yeoman School remained in operation until April 1945. By that time, ISTC had graduated 14,000 WAVES.

Some of the WAVES recruits celebrated the second anniversary of their organization by de-tasseling seed corn at Reinbeck, Iowa. The WAVES were given permission to spend their liberty hours on two weekends (29-30 July and 5–6 August 1944) as farm emergency workers. They relieved the 14- and 15-year old workers who de-tasseled during the week. Available truck transport limited the number of WAVES volunteers to about 150. A representative of a corn seed company presented a color slide program explaining the life cycle of the corn plant and why de-tasseling is important for production of high-quality seed corn. The sight of WAVES working in the corn fields attracted both the local citizenry as well as the newsreel cameramen.
(2015 Krein, p 60–1)

Hunter College (Basic Training) 

Beginning in February 1943, most enlisted recruits received their basic training at Hunter College, in the Bronx, New York City, which became known as "USS Hunter". The US Marine and US Coast Guard women recruits also received basic training here.(See USMCWR and #SPARS below.) Boot camp for the WAVES recruits was a six-week program, similar in emphasis and content to the male version.(2001 Goodson) Physical fitness was stressed, with classroom instruction in Navy ranks and ratings, naval history, tradition and customs, courtesy, discipline, and the organization of the fleets.(Hancock) The first class contained 1,993 graduates. From then on, every two weeks, Hunter College would enroll another class numbering between 1,600 and 1,700 WAVES. By the end of WWII, about 81,000 WAVES were trained at Hunter College.

An interesting episode centered around the mess hall at Hunter College according to Van Voris as quoted in The Sextant. The cafeteria staff prepared and served about 15,000 meals every day for the WAVES. At the male boot camps, the recruits were allotted 23 minutes, while the female recruits tended to take a bit longer. Furthermore, while the men would grumble about the chow, the women immediately and loudly complained about the menu. As the number of WAVE recruits assigned to galley duty increased, the quality of the food also increased. By August 1943, a school for cooks and bakers was established. After that, Hunter College became known for its good food, strong coffee, and fresh baked bread.

Georgia State College for Women 

Georgia State College for Women, in Milledgeville, Georgia (now part of Georgia College & State University) was the location of the Naval Training School (Storekeepers - W). The school was opened in 1943, and over 15,000 WAVES attended by the war's end. Most graduates were assigned to stations within the continental US, until an act of Congress permitted WAVES to serve in Alaska and Hawaii, which were US territories at the time.
In a 2019 interview with the Union-Recorder of Milledgeville, Georgia College historian Robert Wilson recalled how the WAVES students, marching in formation through the campus and small town from sunup to sundown, disturbed the tranquility of the formerly genteel upper-class southern women's college. The WAVES were housed separately from the main student body (known as "Jessies"). The 1945 yearbook staff, on its introductory page to the military students, wrote:
"Some in our midst are dressed in Navy blue. They are just like the rest of us, only farther away from home, and sometimes more homesick, even though they proudly wear one of Uncle Sam’s uniforms. Long after they’re gone we’ll still remember their cheerful singing as they march through the rain, the little short girl on the end of the platoon running to keep up, those jaunty salutes, their frequent and impressive graduations, and the smiling ‘Hi’ in reply to our ‘Hey.’"

Wilson also recalled another time in May 1943, when Bob Hope and his USO troupe stopped at Georgia College to entertain the WAVES with a show that would be broadcast throughout the country. So many townspeople lined up to see the show that Hope and his troupe repeated the performance later that evening just for them. The Special Collections of the Ina Dillard Russell Library houses the WAVES uniforms of 2 Milledgeville residents: Dr. Barbara Chandler and Harriet Kidd.

Yeomen recipients of the Navy Cross 
Yeoman 2nd Class Charles B. Fletcher
LCI(L)-5, Sicily
Citation: "The President of the United States takes pleasure in presenting the Navy Cross to Charles Binford Fletcher, Yeoman Second Class, U.S. Navy (Reserve), for extraordinary heroism and devotion to duty in action against the enemy while serving aboard Infantry Landing Craft U.S.S. LCI(L), FIVE (LCI(L)-5), during the amphibious assault on the Island of Sicily on 10 July 1943. Determining the depth over sand bars by swimming toward the beach within hazardous range of hostile guns ashore, Yeoman Second Class Fletcher located a suitable beaching point for disembarking our attack troops. Upon completing this dangerous task and observing several soldiers perilously close to drowning, he risked his life under an unrelenting shower of deadly machine-gun bullets to swim through extremely heavy surf and bring the helpless men to safety. Through his courageous efforts and heroic endurance in the face of withering fire, he was able to accomplish the successful rescue of the soldiers who otherwise might have perished. Yeoman Second Class Fletcher's exceptional courage and valiant devotion to duty in the face of grave danger were in keeping with the highest traditions of the United States Naval Service."
Chief Yeoman Benjamin Sachs (Missing in Action)
USS Liscome Bay (CVE-56), Gilbert Islands
Citation: "The President of the United States takes pride in presenting the Navy Cross (Posthumously) to Benjamin Sachs, Chief Yeoman, U.S. Navy, for extraordinary heroism and devotion to duty while serving on board the Escort Carrier U.S.S. LISCOME BAY (CVE-56), in action against the enemy when that vessel was sunk near Makin Island in the Gilbert Islands on 24 November 1943. When the U.S.S. LISCOME BAY was struck by a torpedo, Chief Yeoman Sachs observed an officer lying prone on the deck and partially covered with debris. Disregarding his own safety, he removed the debris, revived his shipmate and led the way through the only possible escape route. Then he fastened a life preserver to the officer's body and assisted him over the side. The conduct of Chief Yeoman Sachs throughout this action reflects great credit upon himself, and was in keeping with the highest traditions of the United States Naval Service. He gallantly gave his life for his country."
Yeoman 1st Class James L. Snyder
USS Nevada (BB-36), Pearl Harbor, Hawaii
Citation: "The President of the United States takes pleasure in presenting the Navy Cross to James L. Snyder, Yeoman First Class, U.S. Navy, for exceptional courage, presence of mind, and devotion to duty and disregard for his personal safety while serving on board the Battleship U.S.S. NEVADA (BB-36), during the Japanese attack on the United States Pacific Fleet in Pearl Harbor, Territory of Hawaii, on 7 December 1941. As phone-talker on the navigation bridge of the U.S.S. NEVADA (BB-36), Yeoman First Class Snyder remained on the navigation bridge until forced by fire to leap to safety to the bridge below. Thence he went to an antiaircraft gun ammunition ready box and despite the fact that the heat was exploding other similar boxes, he removed all the ammunition thereby saving lives and assuring continuance of the gun's operation. The conduct of Yeoman First Class Snyder throughout this action reflects great credit upon himself, and was in keeping with the highest traditions of the United States Naval Service."

Gallery

Korean War

Yeomen recipients of the Navy Cross 
According to the US Department of Defense, (ValorPortal Korea) no yeomen were awarded the Navy Cross during the Korean War.

Gallery

Cold War

Vietnam War

Yeomen recipients of the Navy Cross 
According to the US Department of Defense,(ValorPortal Vietnam) one yeoman was awarded the Navy Cross during the Vietnam War.
Gary G Gallagher Y3c

Capture of USS Pueblo by North Korea

Gallery

Rate and rating 

The US Navy has a hierarchy that is unique among the US armed forces. "Rank" is reserved for naval officers and warrant officers. "Rate" and "rating" is applied to enlisted personnel. "Rate" refers to a seaman's pay grade; "rating" refers to the occupational specialty. The approximate naval equivalent of the US Army infantry sergeant would be a boatswain's mate second class. Following is a brief listing of the various yeoman rates and ratings between 1797 and 1896:

 Yeoman of the gunroom (1797-1813)
 Captain's clerk (1798)
=> changed to yeoman (1835)
=> changed to ship's yeoman (1884)
=> changed to yeoman (1893)
 Carpenter's yeoman (1798)
 Gunner's yeoman (1798-1838)
 Boatswain's yeoman (1799-1864)
 Paymaster's steward (1861)
=> changed to paymaster's writer (1867)
=> changed to paymaster's yeoman 1c, 2c, 3c (1870)
=> discontinued 1893
 Engineer's yeoman (1874-1893)
 Equipment yeoman (1884-1893)
 Ship's writer (1865)
=> changed to writer 1c (1893)
=> changed to yeoman 1c (1896)	
 Writer 2c and 3c (1893)
=> changed to yeoman 2c and 3c (1896)

Note that this list illustrates the gradual shift towards administrative and clerical duties between 1800 and 1900, tasks which are familiar to modern US Navy yeomen.

Modern navy yeomen 

Today's yeomen performs administrative and clerical work. Their duties include protocol, naval instructions, enlisted evaluations, commissioned officer fitness reports, naval messages, visitors, telephone calls and mail (both conventional and electronic). They organize files, operate office equipment, and order and distribute office supplies. They write and type business and social letters, notices, directives, forms and reports. Both yeoman and yeoman submarine ratings require at least a 4-year enlistment.

Training
Yeoman Class 'A' School, approximately 7 weeks long, is held at the Naval Technical Training Center (NTTC), located on the Naval Air Station Meridian in Mississippi. Yeomen in the submarine service (YNS) then attend 4 weeks of submarine instruction at the Naval Submarine Base New London in Connecticut. Yeoman Class 'C' school, for flag officer writer (NEC A15A), is also at NTTC Meridian, and is run as a five-week course.

Flag writer

A yeoman flag writer is a senior yeoman, typically at the petty officer first class (E-6) level or higher, who serves on the personal staffs of flag and/or general officers and certain other senior officers. Flag writers draft personal and professional correspondence, act on matters of social usage, protocol, honors and ceremonies, prepare and liquidate travel orders, and prepare officer reports of fitness for signature by a flag or general officer. They must be able to function independently. Individuals serving as flag writers are in a highly visible position and must conduct themselves in a professional manner at all times.  Additionally, members will be required to satisfactorily meet any additional requirements of the flag officer.

Rate structure

Yeoman Seaman Recruit / YNSR (E-1)
Yeoman Seaman Apprentice / YNSA (E-2)
Yeoman Seaman / YNSN (E-3)  (See USN apprenticeships)
Yeoman Third Class / YN3 (E-4)
Yeoman Second Class / YN2 (E-5)
Yeoman First Class / YN1 (E-6)
Chief Yeoman / YNC (E-7)
Senior Chief Yeoman / YNCS (E-8)
Master Chief Yeoman / YNCM (E-9)

Gallery

U.S. Marine Corps 
The position of yeoman in the U.S. Marine Corps Reserve was first assigned to women marines during World War II.

U.S. Coast Guard 
Although the U.S. Coast Guard is a separate arm of the U.S. military during peacetime, it becomes a part of the U.S. Navy under wartime conditions. Therefore, a short history of Coast Guard yeomen is appropriate here.

U.S. Revenue Cutter Service

Modern U.S. Coast Guard

SPARS

Navy Ships named in honor of a yeoman
USS Ellis (DD-154)

References

Further reading

External links 

US Navy COOL Rating Info and LADR for YN-Yeoman
US Navy COOL Rating Info and LADR for YNS-Yeoman
Official website of the USS North Carolina memorial
USS North Carolina Living Historians website
GGArchives - The Story of WAVES Recruit Training

1794 establishments in the United States
United States Navy ratings
Yeomen
WAVES (Navy)